Sonu is a given name. People with this name include:
Sonu Shamdasani (born 1962), British male writer
Sonu Walia (born 1964), Indian Bollywood actress
Sonu Shivdasani (born 1965), British male hotelier
Sonu Nigam (born 1973), Indian male playback singer
Sonu Kakkar (born 1979), Indian female playback singer
Sonu Sood (born 1973), Indian actor
Sonu (actress) (Sonu Gowda, born 1990), Indian Kannada film actress
Sonu Beniwal (born 1993), Indian male footballer
Sonu Singh (born 1995), Indian male cricketer
Sonu Chandrapal, Indian actress
Sonu Narwal, Indian male kabaddi player

Indian unisex given names